Jeremy Eriq Glinoga, also known by the name Jeremy G (born September 14, 1999), is a Filipino musician, host and occasional actor. He rose to fame when he joined and became a finalist in the first season of the Filipino reality singing competition The Voice Teens in 2017.

Filmography

Television/Digital

Discography

Awards and nominations

References

1999 births
Living people
Star Magic
Star Music artists